Johor Bahru–Kota Tinggi Highway (Malay: Lebuhraya Johor Bahru–Kota Tinggi), Federal Route 3, also known as Tebrau Highway (Jalan Tebrau) and Jalan Kota Tinggi is a highway that encompasses Federal Route 3 in Johor Bahru, Malaysia. Part of Asian Highway Route AH18, the highway stretches from its southern end at Jalan Wong Ah Fook and Jalan Tun Abdul Razak in the metropolitan area of Johor Bahru to the northern end at the underpass flyover with North–South Expressway Southern Route and Johor Bahru Eastern Dispersal Link Expressway around Pandan. The stretch of Tebrau Highway after this continues as Jalan Pandan and Jalan Kota Tinggi respectively, beyond Pandan. The highway became the backbone of the Johor Bahru road system linking Pandan to the city centre, and to the Johor–Singapore Causeway, before being surpassed by the Johor Bahru Eastern Dispersal Link Expressway in 2012.

History

The highway began as a trunk road. It was later widened into six lane dual-carriageway, and upgraded during the 1980s. The section between Johor Jaya to Ulu Tiram were upgraded in 1995.
Traffic is usually heavy during working hours. There is no proposal to upgrade Tebrau Highway.

Completed developments

Johor Jaya Interchange
In 2003, the government constructed a new flyover at Johor Jaya complex Interchange. At the complex interchange, the road (Jalan Pandan) leads on uphill 50–100 metres north of  the interchange. The construction of the interchange elevated the highway directly from the point north of the interchange.

Since 2005, travellers travelling northward would have to turn into a road which connects carrefour before joining the highway after the interchange. Travellers coming from Jalan Masai Bahru would have to take the flyover which connects with Tebrau Highway, and travelling northbound without diverting into the road connecting carrefour would lead to vehicles turning off into Jalan Masai Lama.

After several delays of the project to cause criticism from public, construction on this interchange was completed in June 2007 and open for public use.

Ulu Tiram–Kota Tinggi road

Under the Ninth Malaysia Plan Project and Iskandar Regional Development Authority (IRDA), the main road between Ulu Tiram and Kota Tinggi was upgraded into dual-carriageway. This included the construction of Ulu Tiram Interchange and some bridges along the road. The project was started in March 2009 and was completed in 2011.

Jalan Tampoi junctions
Construction of the Jalan Tampoi directional-T interchange began on 2011 and was completed on 2013.

Sungai Tebrau bridge
The upgrading works for the Sungai Tebrau bridge near Pandan began in 2013 and was expected to be completed on 2015.

Features

Features of the highway include BLSS LED traffic lights from control centre, variable message system (VMS) and traffic CCTV.

List of interchanges and junctions

See also
 Federal Route 3
 Malaysian expressway system
 Malaysian Federal Roads system

Expressways and highways in Johor